Suheli Par is a coral atoll in the Union Territory of Lakshadweep, India. It is an oval-shaped 17 km long atoll surrounded by a zone of rich marine fauna.

Geography

Islands
There are three islands on the reef encircling the lagoon.

Valiyakara Located at the northern end of the lagoon. This island has retained most of its original vegetation. It has also some largely stunted, unkempt coconut trees and is visited occasionally by workers who collect the coconuts. Hermit crabs are found in abundance. There is a lighthouse on this island. Light ARLHS LAK-015.
Cheriyakara Located on the southeastern side of the lagoon and slightly smaller than Valiyakara. This island has a large coconut plantation. Between mid-October and mid-April, fishermen of Agatti and Kavaratti stay in temporary settlements on this island (average yearly population of 10) They catch tuna in the surrounding waters of the atoll and process it on the island.
Indira-Shastri Dweep is a long sandbank located between the two islands. It was used as a breeding ground by terns.

Ecology
Both islands have coconut trees, as well as Pandanus, Scaevola taccada, Tournefortia argentea and Pemphis acidula bushes.
The grey heron and the black-capped kingfisher have been observed in this atoll. Owing to the rich marine life there was a proposal to declare Suheli Par a marine national park.

In 2006 a ship from Seychelles ran aground on this atoll, but there was no oil spill reported.

References

External links
Suheli Par -Mapcarta
Uninhabited Islands
Birds of Lakshadweep Islands
List of Atolls
An ornithological expedition to the Lakshadweep archipelago
Sources towards a history of the Laccadive Islands

Islands of Lakshadweep
Atolls of India
Islands of India
Populated places in India